Ian Timothy Whitcomb (10 July 1941 – 19 April 2020) was an English entertainer, singer-songwriter, record producer, writer, broadcaster and actor. As part of the British Invasion, his hit song "You Turn Me On" reached number 8 on the Billboard Hot 100 chart in 1965.

He wrote several books on popular music, beginning with After the Ball, published by Penguin Books (Britain) and Simon & Schuster (United States) in 1972. He accompanied his singing by playing the ukulele and, through his records, concerts, and film work, helped to stimulate the revival of interest in the instrument.

Early life
Whitcomb was born in Woking, Surrey, England to Patrick and Eileen (née Burningham). He was the second child of three children. He spent his childhood years in Scarborough, Thorpeness and Putney. His father worked for Whitcomb's grandfather's film company British Screen Classics in the 1920s, eventually co-starring in Mr. Nobody (released by Fox in 1929). His father was a trained pianist and encouraged Whitcomb to also play piano. Growing up, Whitcomb's chief musical inspirations were Phil Harris, Johnnie Ray, Guy Mitchell, Elvis Presley, and George Formby. He was sent away to boarding school in 1949 (Newlands, Seaford, Sussex) at age 8 and there he soon formed a tissue paper-and-comb band to entertain staff and boys with current hits such as "Riders in the Sky".

Music and writing career
At Bryanston, a public school in Dorset, England, Whitcomb began writing comic and other songs.  He started a skiffle group in 1957 and then a rock and roll band in 1959. After leaving school, he worked at Harrods and then as an assistant at film studios.  With his younger brother Robin on drums, he formed a band, The Ragtime Suwanee Six, that played at parties in the Surrey area and was managed by Denny Cordell, later to produce records by Procol Harum and Joe Cocker. Robin went on to play tambourine on Sonny & Cher's hit "I Got You Babe" (1965).

Around 1963, while studying history at Trinity College, Dublin, Ian Whitcomb became a founding member and lead vocalist of Dublin's early rhythm and blues band, Bluesville.  After some unreleased early recordings, Whitcomb travelled to Seattle, where he performed and was signed to record for Jerden Records.  After returning to Dublin, he recorded "This Sporting Life", written by Brownie McGhee and previously recorded as a skiffle number by Chas McDevitt.  Whitcomb's recording was then licensed to the Tower label, a subsidiary of Capitol Records, for release in the US.  It reached number 100 for one week on the Billboard Hot 100.

Their next record release, again credited as Ian Whitcomb & Bluesville,  "You Turn Me On", was largely improvised at the end of a recording session in Dublin.  Released as a single on the Tower label, it reached Billboard's number 8 spot in July 1965 – it was the first Irish-produced record to reach the US charts – but did not chart in Britain. During his summer vacation in 1965, Whitcomb went to America to appear on such television programs as Shindig, Hollywood A Go-Go and American Bandstand. Whitcomb played the Hollywood Bowl with The Beach Boys in 1965 and then toured with The Rolling Stones, The Kinks, and Sam the Sham and the Pharaohs.

"N-E-R-V-O-U-S!", Whitcomb's next release, was recorded in Hollywood and reached No. 59 in Billboard and No. 47 in Cash Box. He returned to Dublin for his history finals and received a BA degree. In 1966 he turned to early popular song: his version of a 1916 Al Jolson comedy number, "Where Did Robinson Crusoe Go with Friday on Saturday Night?" was a West Coast hit, reviving the ukulele before the emergence of Tiny Tim.

After making four albums for the Tower label, Whitcomb retired as a pop performer, later writing that he "wanted no part of the growing pretentiousness of rock with its mandatory drugs and wishy-washy spiritualism and its increasing loud and metallic guitar sounds."  However, in 1969 he produced Mae West on her album called Great Balls of Fire for MGM Records.  Whitcomb then returned to the UK and was commissioned by Penguin Books to write a history of pop music.  This was After the Ball, published  in 1972.   He appeared on several BBC TV show and was an early presenter of the BBC TV show The Old Grey Whistle Test in 1971.

Whitcomb settled in California in the late 1970s.  He starred in and wrote L.A.–My Home Town (BBC TV; 1976) and Tin Pan Alley (PBS; 1974).  He wrote Tin Pan Alley, A Pictorial History (1919–1939) and a novel, Lotusland: A Story of Southern California, published in 1979.   He also provided the music for a documentary film, Bugs Bunny: Superstar (UA), which was narrated by Orson Welles. For Play-Rite Music he cut 18 piano rolls that were included in an album, Pianomelt. His other albums reflected his research into the genres of ragtime, Tin Pan Alley, vaudeville, and music hall. These, beginning with Under the Ragtime Moon  (1972), were released on several record labels including Warner Bros. Records, United Artists, and Decca Records. During that time he also wrote and produced singles for Warner Bros.' country division, most notably "Hands", a massage parlour story, and "A Friend of a Friend of Mine".

In the 1980s Whitcomb published Rock Odyssey: A Chronicle of the Sixties: Ian Whitcomb, a memoir of the 1960s and described by The New York Times as the best personal account of this period. He also published Ragtime America (Limelight Editions, 1988), followed by a memoir of life as a British expatriate living in Los Angeles, Resident Alien (Century, 1990). He wrote extensively on music, culture, and books for a diverse range of magazines including Radio Times, the Los Angeles Times, The Daily Telegraph,  The London Magazine.  He produced a British documentary on black music, Legends of Rhythm and Blues (part of the series Repercussions, made by Third Eye Productions for Channel Four in 1984). During this time he also hosted a radio show in Los Angeles for fifteen years, taking the program from KROQ-FM to KCRW and finally to KPCC-FM. 

He continued to make recordings, producing a series of CD collections: Treasures of Tin Pan Alley, Al Jolson songs, and Titanic- Music As Heard On The Fateful Voyage.  Whitcomb's liner notes were nominated for a Grammy.  His songs are heard in the films Bloody Movie (1987), Cold Sassy Tree (1989), Encino Man (1992), Grass (1999),  Man of the Century (1999), Stanley's Gig (2000), After the Storm (2001), The Cat's Meow (2002), Last Call (2002), Sleep Easy, Hutch Rimes (2002), Lonesome Jim (2005), and Fido (2006).

Later life
Whitcomb lived in Southern California with his wife, Regina (née Enzer), and their dog, Toby.   He performed, on accordion as well as ukulele, at music festivals and major venues throughout America, often with his ragtime band, The Bungalow Boys, as well as with a larger orchestra.  He continued to write, and he made frequent guest appearances. He notably performed live and on recordings as a special guest of ukulele chanteuse Janet Klein's Parlour Boys. He was a regular performer at Cantalini's Restaurant in Playa del Rey, California. He appeared as Grand Marshal in the 24th Occasional Pasadena Doo Dah Parade on November 19, 1999.

From November 2007, Whitcomb had an internet radio program on Wednesday evenings from 8:00 p.m. until 10:00 p.m.(PST) at Luxuria Music. He signed with Premiere Radio Networks in September 2010 to launch The Ian Whitcomb Show on XM satellite radio, Channel 24.   He was named as a BEST OF L.A. in 2008 by Los Angeles magazine.

In 2009 Whitcomb wrote and, with his Bungalow Boys, performed original music for the West Coast Premiere of The Jazz Age, a play by Allan Knee, at the Blank Theater Company's 2nd Stage Theater in Los Angeles. For his work on The Jazz Age, Whitcomb was nominated for an L.A. Theater Award.

Ian was an educator as well as an entertainer. He lectured on early American popular song (and composers) throughout the California library system. He was a favorite speaker at the annual Oregon Festival of American Music and the Workman and Temple Families Homestead Museum.

Illness and death
Whitcomb died in Pasadena, California at a care facility on 19 April 2020, from complications of a stroke he had suffered in 2012. He was 78.

Selected discography

Singles

Albums
1965	You Turn Me On (Billboard #125—Tower T (Mono)/ST (Stereo) 5004)
1966	Ian Whitcomb's Mod, Mod Music Hall (Tower T/ST 5042)
1967	Yellow Underground (Tower T/ST 5071)
1968	Sock Me Some Rock (Tower SDT 5100)
1970	On the Pier (World Record Club/EMI ST 1010)
1972	Under the Ragtime Moon (United Artists UAS 29403)
1972   Great Balls of Fire (Mae West album)UK (MGM 235207):(Liner notes credits:"Piano/conceived/produced/directed by Ian Whitcomb in Hollywood").
1973	You Turn Me On (Ember Records NR 5065)
1974	Hip Hooray for Neville Chamberlain! (Argo/Decca 2DA 162)
1976	Crooner Tunes (First American 7704)
1976	Treasures of Tin Pan Alley (Audiophile AP 115)
1977	Ian Whitcomb's Red Hot Blue Heaven (Warner Bros. K56347)
1979	Ian Whitcomb: The Rock & Roll Years (First American FA 7729)
1980	At The Ragtime Ball (Audiophile AP 147)
1980	Instrumentals (First American FA 7751)
1980	Pianomelt (Sierra Briar SRAS 8708)
1981	In Hollywood! (First American FA 7789)
1982	Don’t Say Goodbye, Miss Ragtime (with Dick Zimmerman) (Stomp Off SOS 1017)
1983	My Wife is Dancing Mad (with Dick Zimmerman) (Stomp Off SOS 1049)
1983	The Boogie Woogie Jungle Snake (ITW Records 01)
1984	Rag Odyssey (Meteor Records MTM-006)
1984	On The Street of Dreams (ITW Records 03)
1986	The Best of Ian Whitcomb (Rhino Records RNLP 127)
1986	Oceans of Love (ITW Records 04)
1987	Steppin’ Out (Audiophile AP 225)
1987	Ian Whitcomb's Ragtime America (Premier PMP 1017)
1990	All the Hits Plus More (Prestige/BBC PRST 005)

Compact discs
1988	Happy Days Are Here Again (Audiophile ACD 242)
1992	Ian Whitcomb’s Ragtime America (ITW 009)
1995	Lotusland—A New Kind of Old-Fashioned Musical Comedy (Audiophile ACD 283)
1996	Let the Rest of the World Go By (Audiophile ACD 267)
1997	The Golden Age of Lounge (Varèse Sarabande VSD 5821)
1997	Ian Whitcomb: You Turn Me On!/Mod Mod Music Hall (Sundazed SC 11044)
1997	Titanic: Music as Heard on the Fateful Voyage (Rhino R2 72821)
1998	Spread a Little Happiness (Audiophile ACD 249)
1998	Titanic Tunes—A Sing-A-Long in Steerage (The Musical Murrays Conducted by Ian Whitcomb) (Varèse Sarabande 5965)
1998	Songs from the Titanic Era (The New White Star Orchestra) (Varèse Sarabande VSF 5966)
1999	Comedy Songs (Audiophile ACD 163)
2001	Sentimentally Yours (Woodpecker Records)
2002	Dance Hall Days (ITW Records)
2003	Under the Ragtime Moon (Vivid Sound B00008WD18)
2005	Old Chestnuts & Rare Treats (ITW Records)
2005	Words & Music (ITW Records)
2006	Lone Pine Blues (Vivid Sound NACD3229; Japanese import only)
2011	Now and Then (Cayenne Music)
2011	I Love A Piano (Rivermont BSW-2218) with Adam Swanson
2012	Songs Without Words (Rivermont BSW-3136) 2-CD set
2014	The Golden Age of Tin Pan Alley (Rivermont BSW-3137) 2-CD set

Books
1972  After the Ball: Pop Music from Rag to Rock (Allen Lane/Penguin) .
1973  20th Century Fun Essex Music
1975  Tin Pan Alley: A Pictorial History (Paddington Press) ASIN: B000RC8WOC
1979  Lotusland: A Story of Southern California (Wildwood House) 
1982	Whole Lotta Shakin’: A Rock ‘n’ Roll Scrapbook (Arrow) ASIN: B000OHDDPI
1983	Rock Odyssey: A Chronicle of the Sixties (Doubleday/Anchor) 
1986	Irving Berlin & Ragtime America (Arrow) 
1990	Resident Alien (Century) 
1994	The Beckoning Fairground: Notes of a British Exile (California Classics) 
1994	Treasures of Tin Pan Alley (Mel Bay)
1995	Vaudeville Favorites (Mel Bay)
1996	The Best of Vintage Dance (Mel Bay)
1997	Songs of the Ragtime Era (Mel Bay)
1998	The Titanic Songbook (Mel Bay)
1998	Titanic Tunes (Mel Bay)
1998	Songs of the Jazz Age (Mel Bay)
1999	Ukulele Heaven (Mel Bay)
2001	Uke Ballads (Mel Bay)
2003	The Cat's Meow (Mel Bay)
2007	The Ian Whitcomb Songbook (Mel Bay)
2009   Letters From Lotusland (Wild Shore Press) 
2011   Ian Whitcomb's Ukulele Sing-Along (Alfred Music Publishing)  (Book & CD)
2012   Ukulele Heroes: The Golden Age (Hal Leonard)

Appearances

Screen
1997	Contact
2000	Stanley's Gig
2004	Open House
2011	6 1/2 Weeks
2012	Forbidden Lovers
2012	Table For Twelve
2012	His Mother's Lover
2013	Lesbian One Night Stand
2014	His Lover's Son

Television
1965    Thank Your Lucky Stars
1965    Shindig
1965    Hollywood A Go-Go
1965    Shivaree
1965    Where the Action Is
1967    The Pat Boone Show
1971    The Old Grey Whistle Test
1973    Today
1975    The Tonight Show Starring Johnny Carson
1975    The Merv Griffin Show
1976    The Late Late Show
1977    L.A–My Home Town
1979    Tomorrow
1985    Don't Say Good Bye, Miss Ragtime
1997    The Weird Al Show
2010    Ave 43

Notes
The New York Times, 26 April 1998.
The New York Times, 22 January 1984

References

External links
Ian Whitcomb's website

 

 Travis Elborough, "Ian Whitcomb – Resident Englishman", The Dabbler, 21 April 2015

1941 births
2020 deaths
British ukulele players
English male singers
English male singer-songwriters
English record producers
English expatriates in the United States
People from Woking
Alumni of Trinity College Dublin
People educated at Bryanston School